Frequency modulation (FM) is the encoding of information in a carrier wave by varying the instantaneous frequency of the wave. The technology is used in telecommunications, radio broadcasting, signal processing, and computing.

In analog frequency modulation, such as radio broadcasting, of an audio signal representing voice or music, the instantaneous frequency deviation, i.e. the difference between the frequency of the carrier and its center frequency, has a functional relation to the modulating signal amplitude.

Digital data can be encoded and transmitted with a type of frequency modulation known as frequency-shift keying (FSK), in which the instantaneous frequency of the carrier is shifted among a set of frequencies. The frequencies may represent digits, such as '0' and '1'. FSK is widely used in computer modems, such as fax modems, telephone caller ID systems, garage door openers, and other low-frequency transmissions. Radioteletype also uses FSK.

Frequency modulation is widely used for FM radio broadcasting. It is also used in telemetry, radar, seismic prospecting, and monitoring newborns for seizures via EEG, two-way radio systems, sound synthesis, magnetic tape-recording systems and some video-transmission systems. In radio transmission, an advantage of frequency modulation is that it has a larger signal-to-noise ratio and therefore rejects radio frequency interference better than an equal power amplitude modulation (AM) signal. For this reason, most music is broadcast over FM radio. 

However, under severe enough multipath conditions it performs much more poorly than AM, with distinct high frequency noise artifacts that are audible with lower volumes and less complex tones.  With high enough volume and carrier deviation audio distortion starts to occur that otherwise wouldn't be present without multipath or with an AM signal.

Frequency modulation and phase modulation are the two complementary principal methods of angle modulation; phase modulation is often used as an intermediate step to achieve frequency modulation. These methods contrast with amplitude modulation, in which the amplitude of the carrier wave varies, while the frequency and phase remain constant.

Theory

where ,  being the sensitivity of the frequency modulator and  being the amplitude of the modulating signal or baseband signal.

While most of the energy of the signal is contained within fc ± fΔ, it can be shown by Fourier analysis that a wider range of frequencies is required to precisely represent an FM signal. The frequency spectrum of an actual FM signal has components extending infinitely, although their amplitude decreases and higher-order components are often neglected in practical design problems.

Sinusoidal baseband signal
Mathematically, a baseband modulating signal may be approximated by a sinusoidal continuous wave signal with a frequency fm. This method is also named as single-tone modulation. The integral of such a signal is:

In this case, the expression for y(t) above simplifies to:

where the amplitude  of the modulating sinusoid is represented in the peak deviation  (see frequency deviation).

The harmonic distribution of a sine wave carrier modulated by such a sinusoidal signal can be represented with Bessel functions; this provides the basis for a mathematical understanding of frequency modulation in the frequency domain.

Modulation index
As in other modulation systems, the modulation index indicates by how much the modulated variable varies around its unmodulated level. It relates to variations in the carrier frequency:

For a sine wave modulation, the modulation index is seen to be the ratio of the peak frequency deviation of the carrier wave to the frequency of the modulating sine wave.

Sometimes modulation index  is considered as NFM, otherwise wideband FM (WFM or FM).

For digital modulation systems, for example binary frequency shift keying (BFSK), where a binary signal modulates the carrier, the modulation index is given by:

In the case of digital modulation, the carrier  is never transmitted.

(Compare this with chirp spread spectrum, which uses extremely wide frequency deviations to achieve processing gains comparable to traditional, better-known spread-spectrum modes).

With a tone-modulated FM wave, if the modulation frequency is held constant and the modulation index is increased, the (non-negligible) bandwidth of the FM signal increases but the spacing between spectra remains the same; some spectral components decrease in strength as others increase. If the frequency deviation is held constant and the modulation frequency increased, the spacing between spectra increases.

Frequency modulation can be classified as narrowband if the change in the carrier frequency is about the same as the signal frequency, or as wideband if the change in the carrier frequency is much higher (modulation index > 1) than the signal frequency. For example, narrowband FM (NFM) is used for two-way radio systems such as Family Radio Service, in which the carrier is allowed to deviate only 2.5 kHz above and below the center frequency with speech signals of no more than 3.5 kHz bandwidth. Wideband FM is used for FM broadcasting, in which music and speech are transmitted with up to 75 kHz deviation from the center frequency and carry audio with up to a 20 kHz bandwidth and subcarriers up to 92 kHz.

Bessel functions

For the case of a carrier modulated by a single sine wave, the resulting frequency spectrum can be calculated using Bessel functions of the first kind, as a function of the sideband number and the modulation index. The carrier and sideband amplitudes are illustrated for different modulation indices of FM signals. For particular values of the modulation index, the carrier amplitude becomes zero and all the signal power is in the sidebands.

Since the sidebands are on both sides of the carrier, their count is doubled, and then multiplied by the modulating frequency to find the bandwidth. For example, 3 kHz deviation modulated by a 2.2 kHz audio tone produces a modulation index of 1.36. Suppose that we limit ourselves to only those sidebands that have a relative amplitude of at least 0.01. Then, examining the chart shows this modulation index will produce three sidebands. These three sidebands, when doubled, gives us (6 × 2.2 kHz) or a 13.2 kHz required bandwidth.

Carson's rule

A rule of thumb, Carson's rule states that nearly all (≈98 percent) of the power of a frequency-modulated signal lies within a bandwidth  of:

where , as defined above, is the peak deviation of the instantaneous frequency  from the center carrier frequency ,  is the Modulation index which is the ratio of frequency deviation to highest frequency in the modulating signal and is the highest frequency in the modulating signal.
Condition for application of Carson's rule is only sinusoidal signals. For non-sinusoidal signals:

where W  is the highest frequency in the modulating signal but non-sinusoidal in nature and D is the Deviation ratio which the ratio of frequency deviation to highest frequency of modulating non-sinusoidal signal.

Noise reduction
FM provides improved signal-to-noise ratio (SNR), as compared for example with AM. Compared with an optimum AM scheme, FM typically has poorer SNR below a certain signal level called the noise threshold, but above a higher level – the full improvement or full quieting threshold – the SNR is much improved over AM. The improvement depends on modulation level and deviation. For typical voice communications channels, improvements are typically 5–15 dB. FM broadcasting using wider deviation can achieve even greater improvements. Additional techniques, such as pre-emphasis of higher audio frequencies with corresponding de-emphasis in the receiver, are generally used to improve overall SNR in FM circuits. Since FM signals have constant amplitude, FM receivers normally have limiters that remove AM noise, further improving SNR.

Implementation

Modulation
FM signals can be generated using either direct or indirect frequency modulation:
 Direct FM modulation can be achieved by directly feeding the message into the input of a voltage-controlled oscillator.
 For indirect FM modulation, the message signal is integrated to generate a phase-modulated signal. This is used to modulate a crystal-controlled oscillator, and the result is passed through a frequency multiplier to produce an FM signal. In this modulation, narrowband FM is generated leading to wideband FM later and hence the modulation is known as indirect FM modulation.

Demodulation

Many FM detector circuits exist. A common method for recovering the information signal is through a Foster–Seeley discriminator or ratio detector. A phase-locked loop can be used as an FM demodulator. Slope detection demodulates an FM signal by using a tuned circuit which has its resonant frequency slightly offset from the carrier. As the frequency rises and falls the tuned circuit provides a changing amplitude of response, converting FM to AM. AM receivers may detect some FM transmissions by this means, although it does not provide an efficient means of detection for FM broadcasts.

Applications

Doppler effect
When an echolocating bat approaches a target, its outgoing sounds return as echoes, which are Doppler-shifted upward in frequency. In certain species of bats, which produce constant frequency (CF) echolocation calls, the bats compensate for the Doppler shift by lowering their call frequency as they approach a target. This keeps the returning echo in the same frequency range of the normal echolocation call. This dynamic frequency modulation is called the Doppler Shift Compensation (DSC), and was discovered by Hans Schnitzler in 1968

Magnetic tape storage
FM is also used at intermediate frequencies by analog VCR systems (including VHS) to record the luminance (black and white) portions of the video signal. Commonly, the chrominance component is recorded as a conventional AM signal, using the higher-frequency FM signal as bias. FM is the only feasible method of recording the luminance ("black-and-white") component of video to (and retrieving video from) magnetic tape without distortion; video signals have a large range of frequency components – from a few hertz to several megahertz, too wide for equalizers to work with due to electronic noise below −60 dB. FM also keeps the tape at saturation level, acting as a form of noise reduction; a limiter can mask variations in playback output, and the FM capture effect removes print-through and pre-echo. A continuous pilot-tone, if added to the signal – as was done on V2000 and many Hi-band formats – can keep mechanical jitter under control and assist timebase correction.

These FM systems are unusual, in that they have a ratio of carrier to maximum modulation frequency of less than two; contrast this with FM audio broadcasting, where the ratio is around 10,000. Consider, for example, a 6-MHz carrier modulated at a 3.5-MHz rate; by Bessel analysis, the first sidebands are on 9.5 and 2.5 MHz and the second sidebands are on 13 MHz and −1 MHz. The result is a reversed-phase sideband on +1 MHz; on demodulation, this results in unwanted output at 6 – 1 = 5 MHz. The system must be designed so that this unwanted output is reduced to an acceptable level.

Sound
FM is also used at audio frequencies to synthesize sound. This technique, known as FM synthesis, was popularized by early digital synthesizers and became a standard feature in several generations of personal computer sound cards.

Radio

Edwin Howard Armstrong (1890–1954) was an American electrical engineer who invented wideband frequency modulation (FM) radio.
He patented the regenerative circuit in 1914, the superheterodyne receiver in 1918 and the super-regenerative circuit in 1922. Armstrong presented his paper, "A Method of Reducing Disturbances in Radio Signaling by a System of Frequency Modulation", (which first described FM radio) before the New York section of the Institute of Radio Engineers on November 6, 1935. The paper was published in 1936.

As the name implies, wideband FM (WFM) requires a wider signal bandwidth than amplitude modulation by an equivalent modulating signal; this also makes the signal more robust against noise and interference. Frequency modulation is also more robust against signal-amplitude-fading phenomena. As a result, FM was chosen as the modulation standard for high frequency, high fidelity radio transmission, hence the term "FM radio" (although for many years the BBC called it "VHF radio" because commercial FM broadcasting uses part of the VHF band—the FM broadcast band). FM receivers employ a special detector for FM signals and exhibit a phenomenon known as the capture effect, in which the tuner "captures" the stronger of two stations on the same frequency while rejecting the other (compare this with a similar situation on an AM receiver, where both stations can be heard simultaneously). However, frequency drift or a lack of selectivity may cause one station to be overtaken by another on an adjacent channel. Frequency drift was a problem in early (or inexpensive) receivers; inadequate selectivity may affect any tuner.

An FM signal can also be used to carry a stereo signal; this is done with multiplexing and demultiplexing before and after the FM process. The FM modulation and demodulation process is identical in stereo and monaural processes. A high-efficiency radio-frequency switching amplifier can be used to transmit FM signals (and other constant-amplitude signals). For a given signal strength (measured at the receiver antenna), switching amplifiers use less battery power and typically cost less than a linear amplifier. This gives FM another advantage over other modulation methods requiring linear amplifiers, such as AM and QAM.

FM is commonly used at VHF radio frequencies for high-fidelity broadcasts of music and speech. Analog TV sound is also broadcast using FM. Narrowband FM is used for voice communications in commercial and amateur radio settings. In broadcast services, where audio fidelity is important, wideband FM is generally used. In two-way radio, narrowband FM (NBFM) is used to conserve bandwidth for land mobile, marine mobile and other radio services.

There are reports that on October 5, 1924, Professor Mikhail A. Bonch-Bruevich, during a scientific and technical conversation in the Nizhny Novgorod Radio Laboratory, reported about his new method of telephony, based on a change in the period of oscillations. Demonstration of frequency modulation was carried out on the laboratory model.

See also

 Amplitude modulation
 Continuous-wave frequency-modulated radar
 Chirp
 FM broadcasting
 FM stereo
 FM-UWB (FM and Ultra Wideband)
 History of radio
 Modulation, for a list of other modulation techniques

References

Further reading
  .
  .
  (2nd ed., 2005)

External links
 Analog Modulation online interactive demonstration using Python in Google Colab Platform, by C Foh.

Radio modulation modes